Kévin Parienté (born 19 January 1987) is a French professional footballer who plays a midfielder. Besides France, he has played in Spain, Turkey, and Israel.

Biography

Early years
Born in Paris, Pariente was a student at the Clairefontaine, an elite football academy in France. From there he joined the youth side of Paris Saint-Germain and teamed up with Rudy Haddad.

Being that the two players are Jewish, Israeli club Maccabi Tel Aviv brought Pariente in for a trial after he had played 18 matches for Levante's B side. Haddad convinced Pariente to sign for Maccabi. Pariente stated his desire to sign for the club after feeling alone in Spain and in Israel he has family in Ashdod. Pariente impressed during his trial but did not receive a contract offer.

His ended contract with Sedan was on 1 February 2010 dissolved, the midfielder signed a new deal for AS Cannes, until the end of season. In January 2012, he finally moved to Israel and signed at Hapoel Petah Tikva.

References

External links
 Levante UD profile
 

1987 births
Living people
20th-century French Jews
Jewish footballers
French footballers
Association football midfielders
Jewish French sportspeople
Ligue 2 players
Israeli Premier League players
Liga Leumit players
Levante UD footballers
CS Sedan Ardennes players
AS Cannes players
Bucaspor footballers
Hapoel Petah Tikva F.C. players
Granada CF footballers
Maccabi Umm al-Fahm F.C. players
Maccabi Jaffa F.C. players
Hapoel Mahane Yehuda F.C. players
Beitar Ramat Gan F.C. players
Hapoel Hod HaSharon F.C. players
Shikun Vatikim Ramat Gan F.C. players
INF Clairefontaine players
French emigrants to Israel
Footballers from Paris